Altrip is a municipality in the Rhein-Pfalz-Kreis, in Rhineland-Palatinate, Germany. It is situated on the left bank of the Rhine, approx. 7 km southeast of Ludwigshafen.

Sister city
Altrip has one sister city:
  Kutztown, Pennsylvania, United States

References

Rhein-Pfalz-Kreis